Boxer the Horse was an indie rock band from Charlottetown, Prince Edward Island, Canada.

History
Their debut album Would You Please was released in 2010 to high critical acclaim with many reviews comparing the band's sound to Pavement and the Kinks. 

In 2010 they were named the best new band in Canada by CBC Radio 3 at the annual Bucky Awards. 

The band's second album, French Residency, was released on March 13, 2012.

As of 2021, Christian Ledwell had left the music industry. 
Andrew Woods is frontman for the band Legal Vertigo.
Jeremy Gaudet is a member of the band Kiwi Jr.

Discography

 The Late Show (2008, EP), OBR Records
 Would You Please (2010), Collagen Rock Records
 French Residency (2012), Independent

References

External links
 Official Myspace page

Canadian indie rock groups
Musical groups from Charlottetown
Musical groups established in 2010
2010 establishments in Prince Edward Island